Jean-Blaise Martin, full name Nicolas Jean-Blaise Martin (February 24, 1768 in Paris – October 28, 1837 in Tourzel-Ronzières) was a French opera singer whose tessitura lay between tenor and baritone, which became later known as "baryton-martin".

Life and career 
Jean-Blaise Martin began singing publicly as a child, before his voice broke. He made his professional operatic debut in 1789, at the Théâtre Feydeau, in Paris, in a parody called . He then studied with Madame Dugazon, and made his debut at the Opéra-Comique in 1794, and sang there until 1823. He became a member of the theatre's administrative committee in 1801. He also taught at the Conservatoire de Musique of Paris, from 1825 to 1837.

He composed one  opéra comique, produced at the Théâtre Feydeau in 1796.

During his career, he created some 15 roles in operas by Nicolas Dalayrac, François Devienne, André Grétry, Étienne Méhul, Nicolas Isouard, Ferdinando Paer, etc.

Martin's voice was described as a "", meaning a deep-voiced dark tenor, or as a "", meaning a clear-voiced high baritone; the compass was E flat to a, with a falsetto extension to a'. Modern examples of this voice type include French baritone Michel Dens, and more recently Bernard Sinclair, who can be heard in a few operetta recordings such as La fille de Madame Angot, Les cloches de Corneville, and Valses de Vienne.

Camille Maurane and Jacques Jansen are widely recognized as having been the best exponents of the role.

Roles created

1804: A bard in Ossian, ou Les bardes by Jean-François Le Sueur
1821: Barnabé in Le maître de chapelle by Ferdinando Paer

Sources 
 Roland Mancini and Jean-Jacques Rouveroux,  (orig. H. Rosenthal and J. Warrack, French edition), Guide de l’opéra, Les indispensables de la musique (Fayard, 1995).

References 
Biography of Jean-Blaise Martin (in German) at Operissimo
Bernard Sinclair, a baryton-martin (French biography)

1768 births
1837 deaths
Singers from Paris
French operatic baritones
Burials at Père Lachaise Cemetery